Despić House is an old merchant house in Sarajevo, Bosnia and Herzegovina that was established in 1881 by one of the wealthiest and most prominent Serb families in Sarajevo. It is a branch of the Museum of Sarajevo.

References

External links 
 Museum of Sarajevo - Despić House website

Museums in Sarajevo
History museums in Bosnia and Herzegovina
National Monuments of Bosnia and Herzegovina
Residential buildings in Bosnia and Herzegovina
Museums established in 1881
1881 establishments in Austria-Hungary
Culture in Sarajevo
Serbs of Bosnia and Herzegovina